Hong Mei Tsuen is a village in Ha Tsuen, Yuen Long District, Hong Kong.

Administration
Hong Mei Tsuen is a recognized village under the New Territories Small House Policy.

History
At the time of the 1911 census, the population of Hong Mei Tsuen was 52. The number of males was 21.

References

External links

 Delineation of area of existing village Hong Mei Tsuen (Ha Tsuen) for election of resident representative (2019 to 2022)

Villages in Yuen Long District, Hong Kong
Ha Tsuen